Sharlene Wells (born 16 March 1964) is a Paraguayan-American author, singer, and reporter from Salt Lake City, Utah who was Miss America 1985. She worked with ESPN from 1987 to 2002 and was appointed by the U.S. Secretary of Defense to the Defense Advisory Committee on Women in the Armed Forces in 2015.

Family and early life
Hawkes (née Wells), was born in Asunción, Paraguay and spent most of her childhood in Mexico, Chile and Ecuador.
She was the first foreign-born, bilingual Miss America. She spent most of her teenaged years in Buenos Aires, Argentina. When she won the Miss America title, her parents were living in Holladay, Utah, a suburb of Salt Lake City. Being crowned Miss America was seen by some as an antidote to the scandal associated with the prior year's winner, Vanessa Williams. In 1985, Deseret Book published a biography of Wells, written by Sheri Dew.

Hawkes is a member of the Church of Jesus Christ of Latter-day Saints (LDS Church). She attended Brigham Young University (BYU), from which she graduated in 1988 with a bachelor's degree in communications.

Miss America
The choice of Wells as Miss America was widely seen as a way to overcome the scandal connected with her predecessor. Wells publicly stated her support for the reelection of Ronald Reagan and her opposition to abortion rights, pre-marital sex, and the Equal Rights Amendment.

Education and career
Hawkes is the author, or co-author, of several books. This includes a book written by Hawkes and Barbara Barrington Jones entitled The Inside Outside Beauty Book (1989), Living in but not of The World (1997), and Kissing a Frog: Four Steps to Finding Comfort Outside Your Comfort Zone. She is also a singer and has released albums called When We Will All Believe (1994) and Songs of the Morning Stars (1996).

Hawkes holds a master's degree in integrated marketing communications from the University of Utah.

Hawkes was a horse racing and college football reporter with ESPN from 1987 to 2002.

Since 2007, Hawkes has worked to help veterans and their families. This includes a program to bring wives and daughters of veterans killed in the line of duty to the Miss America Pageant.

In 2015 Hawkes was appointed by the U.S. Secretary of Defense to the Defense Advisory Committee on Women in the Armed Forces.

As of August 2016, Hawkes is serving as executive vice president of Story Rock Electronic Publishing, and as president of its military division, Remember My Service, producing historical records for military personnel.

Hawkes served as a judge for the Miss America 2017 competition.

References

Sources
 Knight-Ridder newspapers article on Wells
 BYU Magazine article on Hawkes
 Sep. 17, 1984 UPI article on Wells
 Ensign Nov. 1984 article on Wells
 Sun-Sentinel article on Wells
 Haws, J. B. The Mormon Image in the American Mind. New York: Oxford University Press, 2013. p. 155.

1964 births
Women sports announcers
Latter Day Saints from Utah
American television sports announcers
Living people
American horse racing announcers
Brigham Young University alumni
Tennis commentators
Miss America winners
College football announcers
Miss America Preliminary Swimsuit winners
American expatriates in Paraguay
People from Asunción
University of Utah alumni
American expatriates in Chile
American expatriates in Argentina
American expatriates in Mexico
American expatriates in Ecuador